Nicolás Almagro was the defending champion, but first-seeded David Ferrer defeated him 4–6, 6–2, 7–6(7–2), in the final.

Seeds

Draw

Finals

Top half

Bottom half

External links
Association of Tennis Professionals (ATP) – singles draw
Association of Tennis Professionals (ATP) – qualifying draw

Singles